Federal Governmental Institution — penal colony No. 1 of the Federal Penitentiary Service of Russia in the Republic of Mordovia, also known as the Mordovian Zone (Mordovskaya zona) is a Russian prison located in the settlement of Sosnovka in Mordovia. It is one of the seven maximum-security supermax prisons operated by the Federal Penitentiary Service for convicts sentenced to life imprisonment in Russia. Both life prisoners and prisoners sentenced to 25 years of imprisonment serve their sentences in the Mordovian Zone.

References

Prisons in Russia
Buildings and structures in Mordovia
1931 establishments in Russia